Atlanta is a town in Jackson Township, Hamilton County, Indiana, United States. The population was 725 at the 2010 census.

History
Atlanta had its start by the merger of the three neighboring rival towns of Spargerville, Shielville, and Buena Vista. The earliest part of what is now Atlanta was laid out in 1834, and the town has been called Atlanta since 1885. The town most likely was named after Atlanta, Georgia.

Roads Hotel was listed on the National Register of Historic Places in 1987.

Geography
Atlanta is located at  (40.213954, -86.025498).

The town is noted throughout the area for the Atlanta New Earth Festival, held on the fourth weekend of September annually since 1973.

Demographics

2010 census
As of the 2010 census, there were 725 people, 265 households, and 203 families living in the town. The racial makeup of the town was 97.8% White, 0.6% African American, 1.4% from other races, and 0.3% from two or more races. Hispanic or Latino of any race were 1.9% of the population.

There were 265 households, of which 39.2% had children under the age of 18 living with them, 55.8% were married couples living together, 13.2% had a female householder with no husband present, 7.5% had a male householder with no wife present, and 23.4% were non-families. 17.0% of all households were made up of individuals, and 8.4% had someone living alone who was 65 years of age or older. The average household size was 2.69 and the average family size was 3.03.

The median age in the town was 36.1 years. 27% of residents were under the age of 18; 7% were between the ages of 18 and 24; 27.4% were from 25 to 44; 28.4% were from 45 to 64; and 10.1% were 65 years of age or older. The gender makeup of the town was 49.0% male and 51.0% female.

2000 census
As of the 2000 census, there were 761 people, 261 households, and 205 families living in the town. The racial makeup of the town was 96.85% White, 0.66% Native American, 0.26% Asian, 1.45% from other races, and 0.79% from two or more races. Hispanic or Latino of any race were 2.10% of the population.

There were 261 households, out of which 44.8% had children under the age of 18 living with them, 62.1% were married couples living together, 10.3% had a female householder with no husband present, and 21.1% were non-families. 16.5% of all households were made up of individuals, and 6.1% had someone living alone who was 65 years of age or older. The average household size was 2.90 and the average family size was 3.20.

In the town, the population was spread out, with 32.1% under the age of 18, 7.4% from 18 to 24, 33.9% from 25 to 44, 19.7% from 45 to 64, and 7.0% who were 65 years of age or older. The median age was 34 years. For every 100 females, there were 97.2 males. For every 100 females age 18 and over, there were 92.2 males.

The median income for a household in the town was $43,036, and the median income for a family was $47,159. Males had a median income of $33,438 versus $22,011 for females. The per capita income for the town was $16,342. About 5.5% of families and 7.0% of the population were below the poverty line, including 5.9% of those under age 18 and 10.9% of those age 65 or over.

References

External links
 Town of Atlanta, Indiana, website

Towns in Hamilton County, Indiana
Towns in Indiana
Indianapolis metropolitan area